German submarine U-250 was a Type VIIC U-boat of Nazi Germany's navy (Kriegsmarine) during World War II. The submarine was laid down on 9 January 1943 at the Friedrich Krupp Germaniawerft yard at Kiel as yard number 684. She was launched on 11 November 1943 and commissioned on 12 December under the command of Kapitänleutnant Werner-Karl Schmidt.

In one patrol, she sank one ship.

The boat was sunk by the Soviet submarine chaser MO103 in the Gulf of Finland (Baltic) on 30 July 1944.

Design
German Type VIIC submarines were preceded by the shorter Type VIIB submarines. U-250 had a displacement of  when at the surface and  while submerged. She had two shafts and two  propellers.

U-250 was fitted with five  torpedo tubes (four fitted at the bow and one at the stern), fourteen torpedoes, one  SK C/35 naval gun, (220 rounds), one  Flak M42 and two twin  C/30 anti-aircraft guns. The boat had a complement of between forty-four and sixty.

Service history
After training with the 5th U-boat Flotilla at Kiel, U-250 transferred to the 8th flotilla on 1 July 1944.

Patrol, loss and capture
The boat's first and only patrol was preceded by a pair of short trips between Kiel in Germany, and Reval (now Tallinn in Estonia), and Zoppot (now Sopot, Poland). U-250s first sortie proper started with her departure from Zoppot on 26 July 1944. She sank the Soviet submarine chaser or patrol boat M-105 on 26 July.

This sinking resulted in a concerted response on the part of the Soviets. M-103 made the kill; dropping a pattern of depth charges which opened a large hole in the U-boat's pressure hull. Only six men escaped the submarine and were taken prisoner, among them Kapitänleutnant Schmidt; forty-six others did not. It was decided to raise U-250, despite her proximity to the German-held shore. Harassing artillery fire was met with a constant smokescreen while divers worked. The Soviets succeeded in raising the boat and taking her to Kronstadt in September 1944 where she was examined. She then served briefly in the Soviet Navy as the TS-14 before being broken up.

Armament

FLAK weaponry
U-250 was mounted with a single 3.7 cm Flakzwilling M43U gun on the LM 42U mount. The LM 42U mount was the most common mount used with the 3.7 cm Flak M42U. The 3.7 cm Flak M42U was the marine version of the 3.7 cm Flak used by the Kriegsmarine on Type VII and Type IX U-boats. U-250 was mounted with two 2cm Flak C38 in a M 43U Zwilling mount with short folding shield on the upper Wintergarten. The M 43U mount was used on a number of U-boats (and ).

Summary of raiding history

Memory 

On 22 October 1996, a joint memorial to Soviet sailors who died on MO-105 and German sailors who drowned on U-250 was opened at the Lutheran Cemetery in Kronstadt. A metal plate with 20 Soviet and 46 German names is attached to the granite stone. At the bottom of the slab there is a bilingual inscription on Russian and German: "Reconciled by death cry out for peace".

References

Notes

Citations

Bibliography

External links

German Type VIIC submarines
World War II submarines of Germany
U-boats commissioned in 1943
U-boats sunk in 1944
U-boats sunk by depth charges
U-boats sunk by Soviet warships
1943 ships
Ships built in Kiel
World War II shipwrecks in the Baltic Sea
Maritime incidents in July 1944